Spears House may refer to:

 Spears House (Greenbrier, Arkansas), listed on the NRHP in Arkansas
 Spears-Craig House, Danville, Kentucky, listed on the NRHP in Kentucky
 Jacob Spears Distillery, Shawhan, Kentucky, listed on the NRHP in Kentucky
 Jacob Spears House, Shawhan, Kentucky, listed on the NRHP in Kentucky
 Spears House (Concord, North Carolina), listed on the NRHP in North Carolina